Dora Elizabeth Gibbs (6 July 1910 – 4 July 2008) was a British swimmer. She competed in the women's 200 metre breaststroke event at the 1928 Summer Olympics.

Gibbs, a member of the Hammersmith Ladies Swimming Club, was a 17-year old working at Selfridges when she won the Olympic trial to represent Great Britain at the 1928 Summer Olympics.

References

External links
 

1910 births
2008 deaths
British female swimmers
Olympic swimmers of Great Britain
Swimmers at the 1928 Summer Olympics
Place of birth missing